Hamburg Aviation is the brand name of the "Luftfahrtcluster Metropolregion Hamburg e.V." (Aviation Cluster Hamburg Metropolitan Region). It is an association of companies, research institutions, educational institutions and the Free and Hanseatic City of Hamburg, with the goal of promoting the aviation industry in the Hamburg Metropolitan Region. With more than 40,000 employees in 2012, it is one of the world's largest sites in the civil aviation industry.

The Hamburg Metropolitan Region: a Centre of Aviation 

Companies based in the Hamburg Metropolitan Region include the aircraft manufacturer Airbus and Lufthansa Technik, a market leader in the field of maintenance, repair, and overhaul of civil aircraft. Hamburg Airport, which first opened in 1912, is one of the world's oldest operational airports to still be based at its original location. There are more than 300 specialist suppliers, including branches of Diehl Aerospace. Many of the numerous small and medium-sized enterprises are represented by the business associations Hanse Aerospace e.V. and HECAS.
Four of Hamburg's universities offer a course of study with significant aviation-related components: 
 the Hamburg University of Applied Sciences (HAW Hamburg)
 the Helmut Schmidt University / University of the German Federal Armed Forces Hamburg
 the Hamburg University of Technology (TUHH)
 and the University of Hamburg
Also based in Hamburg are the German Aerospace Center’s Institute of Aerospace Medicine and Institute of Air Transportation Systems.

The focus on cabins: Crystal Cabin Award and Aircraft Interiors Expo 

A particular focus for many aviation companies in the Hamburg Metropolitan Region is the interior fittings of aircraft along with the design of aircraft cabins. Airbus develops and builds the cabins for the A380 at Finkenwerder Airport, and Lufthansa Technik AG designs in-flight entertainment systems along with luxury VIP fittings for private aircraft. There are also numerous small and medium-sized enterprises specializing in cabin design, fittings, and technology and In-Flight Entertainment and Communications (IFE&C).
The aviation region's focus on this field is clearly seen in the Aircraft Interiors Expo, an annual specialist trade fair held in Hamburg since 2002. Launched in 2007, the Crystal Cabin Award, for outstanding product innovations in the field of aircraft interior fittings, is presented as part of this trade fair. The prize is funded by the Free and Hanseatic City of Hamburg.

The Aerospace Cluster: Hamburg Aviation 

In the field of economics, an accumulation of companies that is spread throughout the value creation chain and interwoven with research and training facilities, such as exists in the aviation industry in the Hamburg Metropolitan Region, is termed a Business cluster. A cluster is defined by a triple helix structure: the interplay between commerce, research and education, and the public sector.
In 2001, companies, universities and government bodies joined forces to establish the “Hamburg Aviation Initiative” in order to promote the development of the aviation industry cluster in Hamburg. This developed into the “Luftfahrtcluster Metropolregion Hamburg e.V.” association, with 15 founding members, formally established in 2011. Hamburg Aviation is the brand name of this association. Its goal is the joint coordination of initiatives to support the aviation industry in the region. Examples of its work include the initiation of cooperative research projects and the management of EU research projects along with regular industry gatherings such as the Hamburg Aviation Forum and the organisation of events designed to secure the next generation of aviation specialists.

Winning the Leading-Edge Cluster competition 

In 2008, the then Hamburg Aviation Initiative was recognised as a Leading-Edge Cluster in the first Leading-Edge Cluster Competition organised by the German Federal Ministry of Education and Research (BMBF). This resulted in a total of 40 million euros of public funding. This partial funding, combined with the support of companies in the cluster, financed numerous research and development projects. The total investment in research and development as a result of winning the competition was over 80 million euros.

Network Projects: ZAL and HCAT 

In 2009, as a network project of the universities, aviation enterprises, industry associations, research institutions and the Free and Hanseatic City of Hamburg, the Center of Applied Aeronautical Research (Zentrum für Angewandte Luftfahrtforschung, or ZAL) was established – an initiative of Hamburg Aviation. The cooperative campus of the Hamburg Centre of Aviation Training (HCAT), is one project focused on the training of qualified specialist personnel, securing the next generation of aviation specialists.

Hamburg Aviation: The Next Generation 

Securing the next generation of qualified personnel is a significant focus of the work of Hamburg Aviation. Numerous projects, jointly supported by the industry, the city and the universities, serve this purpose. Examples include the Faszination Technik Klub, organising lectures and events related to aviation for children and teenagers, and the DLR School Lab at the Hamburg University of Technology, where school pupils can carry out technical and scientific experiments.

International Cooperative Programs 

Another area in which the association is active is the promotion of international cooperation between aviation locations. In May 2009, Hamburg Aviation launched the European Aerospace Cluster Partnership (EACP). The aim of the organisation is to facilitate the exchange of knowledge and to initiate cooperative projects across national boundaries. One such project is CARE: Clean Aerospace Regions, funded by the European Commission. The project provides a framework for 10 partners, 8 of them EACP members, to collaborate in promoting research into ecologically efficient technologies and processes for the air transportation system.

Founding members of Hamburg Aviation 

The original founding members of what is today Hamburg Aviation are:

Commercial enterprises 

 Airbus
 Lufthansa Technik AG
 Hamburg Airport

Associations 

 Hanse-Aerospace e.V.
 HECAS – Hanseatic Engineering & Consulting Association
 German Aerospace Industries Association (BDLI)

Research facilities 

 German Aerospace Center (DLR)
 Hamburg Centre of Aviation Training (HCAT)
 Center for Applied Aeronautical Research (ZAL)

Universities 

 Hamburg University of Applied Sciences (HAW Hamburg)
 Hamburg University of Technology (TUHH)
 Helmut Schmidt University (HSU)
 University of Hamburg

Public sector 

 HWF Hamburgische Gesellschaft für Wirtschaftsförderung mbH (Hamburg Business Development Corporation) 
 Department of the Economy, Transport and Innovation (BWVI)

See also 

 Aviation

Notes

External links 
 http://www.hamburg-aviation.de
 http://www.faszination-fuer-technik.de
 http://www.eacp-aero.eu
 https://web.archive.org/web/20130829020312/http://care-aero.eu/
 http://www.crystal-cabin-award.com

Consortia in Germany
Regional science
Business organisations based in Germany
Aeronautics organizations
Economy of Hamburg
Organisations based in Hamburg